Southside Eagles FC is an Australian football (soccer) club from Bulimba, a suburb of Brisbane. The club was founded when the Germania and Southside Belmont clubs merged in 1968 and it currently competes in Football Queensland Premier League.

History
The Germania soccer club was formed by Rudi Gerhard and Guenther Pieplow and was originally supported by members of Brisbane German community. The club won Brisbane's Division Two at their first attempt in 1962, but were relegated from Division One after a single season. The club returned to Division Two and remained there until clinching promotion again in 1968, but were once again relegated after a single season in the top tier.

The Southside Belmont Soccer Club was originally a junior club. It competed in Division Two at a senior level for two seasons (1964 and 1965), then spent three seasons in Division Three before being absorbed by Germania after the 1968 season.

Germania changed its name to Southside Eagles FC after the 1972 season, as part of a drive from the Queensland Soccer Federation to remove ethnic names from clubs.

Southside Eagles won promotion to Division One after claiming the Division Two championship in 1974, and remained in the top division of Queensland soccer for the next six seasons. This including the 1978 season which was the most successful in the club's history, winning a 'Grand Slam' of trophies: the President’s Cup, the Ampol Cup, the Premiership and the Grand Final. Southside Eagles qualified for the NSL Cup twice during this period, knocked out in the first round by Sydney's Eastern Suburbs in 1978 and Brisbane Lions in 1979, each time losing narrowly by a single goal.

Encouraged by its 1978 success when it was effectively the third strongest Queensland club behind the state's two NSL representatives, Southside Eagles joined the short-lived Queensland State League in 1979, but withdrew after two seasons due to financial losses. Many players left Southside Eagles to join clubs that remained in the State League, and this initiated a long period of decline for the club.

The club fell as low as Division Five which they won in their single season there in 1993, and then slowly climbed back up the divisions.

After winning the Premier Division Two league and grand final in 2010, Southside Eagles were promoted to the second tier of Football Brisbane competition where they have remained in since, and which has been known as Capital League 1 since the 2013 Football Brisbane restructure.

In May 2017, Football Queensland announced Southside Eagles were among the 14 clubs accepted to form the Football Queensland Premier League for its initial season in 2018.

Recent Seasons

Source:

The tier is the level in the Australian soccer league system

Honours
Brisbane Division 2 – Premiers 1962 and 1968 (Germania)
Brisbane Division 2 – Premiers and Champions 1974
Brisbane Division 1 – Premiers and Champions 1978
Ampol Cup – Winners 1978
Brisbane Division 4 – Champions 1990
Brisbane Division 5 – Premiers 1995
Premier Division 2 – Premiers 2003
Premier Division 2 – Premiers and Champions 2010

Coaches
2002–2004     Alan Moreland
2005–2009     Dale Zimmerlie
2010–2014     Gary Henshaw
2015–2018     Roger Hunter
2019–2020 Jarrod Lane
2021–present  Claude Capelli

Assistant coaches 

2008-2010      Michael Burke

References

External links
 

Soccer clubs in Brisbane
Association football clubs established in 1968
1968 establishments in Australia
Bulimba, Queensland